Ouled Aissa (also written Ouled Aïssa) is a town and commune in Charouine District, Adrar Province, in south-central Algeria. According to the 2008 census it has a population of 7,034, up from 5,497 in 1998, with an annual growth rate of 2.5%.

Geography

The commune consists of several villages (including the town of Ouled Aissa) that populate small oases between Talmine commune to the west and Ksar Kaddour and Ouled Said communes to the east. The oases mainly lie at the northern edge of the habitable Gourara region just south of the Grand Erg Occidental, a large area of sand dunes stretching well into Béchar and El Bayadh provinces.

Climate

Ouled Aissa has a hot desert climate (Köppen climate classification BWh), with extremely hot summers and mild winters, and very little precipitation throughout the year.

Transportation

The main road through the commune is a provincial road that starts at the village of Taouennza, passes through Haiha, Yako and Ouled Aissa town before connecting to the N51 national highway northeast of Charouine. A local road branches off south of Ouled Aissa town connecting to Djimjane.

Education

3.2% of the population has a tertiary education, and another 7.3% has completed secondary education. The overall literacy rate is 63.7%, and is 81.0% among males and 45.5% among females.

Localities
As of 1984, the commune was composed of nine localities:

Ouled Aïssa
Tasfaout
Guentour
Djimjane
Taouennza
Haïha
Yako
El Kort
Lahmer

References 

Neighbouring towns and cities

Communes of Adrar Province
Cities in Algeria
Algeria